King Solomon's Mines is a 1937 British adventure film directed by Robert Stevenson and starring Paul Robeson, Cedric Hardwicke, Anna Lee, John Loder and Roland Young. A film adaptation of the 1885 novel of the same name by Henry Rider Haggard, the film was produced by the Gaumont British Picture Corporation at Lime Grove Studios in Shepherd's Bush. Sets were designed by art director Alfred Junge. Of all the novel's adaptations, this film is considered to be the most faithful to the book.

Plot
In 1882, Irish dream chaser Patrick "Patsy" O'Brien and his daughter Kathy have failed to strike it rich in the diamond mines of Kimberley, South Africa (then the Cape Colony). They persuade a reluctant Allan Quartermain to drive them to the coast in his wagon.

Along the way, they encounter another wagon carrying two men in bad shape. Umbopa recovers, but Silvestra Getto dies after boasting to Quartermain that he has found the way to the fabled mines of Solomon. Patsy finds the dead man's map and sneaks off during the night, unwilling to risk his daughter's life. Kathy is unable to persuade  Quartermain to follow him; instead, they rendezvous with Quartermain's new clients, Sir Henry Curtis and retired naval commander John Good, who are hunting for big game.

Kathy steals Quartermain's wagon to pursue her father. When they catch up with her, she refuses to return with them, so they and Umbopa accompany her across the desert and over the mountains shown on the map. During the arduous trek, Curtis and Kathy fall in love. On the other side of the mountains, they are surrounded by unfriendly natives and taken to the kraal of their chief Twala to be questioned. Twala takes them to see the entrance of the mines that are guarded by the feared witch doctor Gagool.

That night, Umbopa reveals that he is the son of the former chief who was treacherously killed by the usurper Twala. He meets with dissidents, led by Infadoos, who are fed up with Twala's cruel reign. Together, they plot an uprising for the next day during the ceremony of the "smelling out of the evildoers." However, Umbopa needs Quartermain to devise a plan that the natives think will counter Gagool's magic.

During the rite, Gagool chooses several natives who are killed on the spot. Recalling having made a bet on the previous year's Derby Day, Good notices in his diary that there will be a total solar eclipse that day at exactly 11:15 a.m. The quick-thinking Quartermain predicts the eclipse as Gagool approaches Umbopa. Umbopa reveals his true identity to the people during the height of the eclipse and the rebellion erupts. Both sides gather their forces, and during the ensuing battle, Curtis kills Twala, ending the civil war.

In the fighting, Kathy slips away to the mine to look for her father. She finds him inside, immobilised by a broken leg but clutching a pouch full of diamonds. Quartermain, Curtis and Good follow her, but Gagool sets off a rockfall to seal them in. Umbopa pursues Gagool back into the mine, where the witch doctor is crushed by falling rocks. The new chief manages to free his friends and gives them an escort to help them cross the desert.

Cast
 Paul Robeson as Umbopa
 Cedric Hardwicke as Allan Quartermain 
 Roland Young as Commander John Good
 John Loder as Sir Henry Curtis
 Anna Lee as Kathy O'Brien
 Arthur Sinclair as Patsy O'Brien
 Robert Adams as Twala
 Arthur Goullet as Sylvestra Getto
 Ecce Homo Toto as Infadoos
 Makubalo Hlubi as Kapse
 Mjujwa as Scragga
 Sydney Fairbrother as Gagool (uncredited)
 Frederick Leister as Diamond Buyer (uncredited)

Production
Gaumont-British announced the film in 1935 and Paul Robeson was signed in 1936. Filming began in Shepherd's Bush, London in November 1936, and the unit then travelled to Africa for a further eight weeks of work.

Charles Bennett is credited as one of the writers, but he claimed that he "didn't really" contribute to the screenplay. He said that he was opposed to the idea of a woman going along on the trip ("it was a damn silly idea") and took himself off the project.

Reception
Writing for Night and Day in 1937, Graham Greene gave the film a neutral review, summarizing it as "a 'seeable' picture." Greene praised the acting of Hardwicke and Young as well as the clever dovetailing of scenes from Geoffrey Barkas' documentary, but he disliked the performances by Loder and Robeson and yearned for Lucoque's 1919 black-and-white version, which he felt was more faithful to Haggard's original 1885 book.

See also
 List of films featuring eclipses

References

External links
 
 
 
 
 Zone Troopers: Website about the different Allan  Quartermain and King Solomon's Mine films

1937 films

1930s fantasy adventure films
1930s English-language films
British black-and-white films
Films based on King Solomon's Mines
Films directed by Robert Stevenson
Films set in 1882
Films set in South Africa
Treasure hunt films

British fantasy adventure films
Films shot in South Africa
Films about mining
Films shot at Lime Grove Studios
1930s British films
Films about witch doctors